John Clerk (died 3 January 1541) was an English bishop.  He was educated at Cambridge University, and went on to serve under Cardinal Wolsey in a variety of capacities.  He was also useful in a diplomatic capacity to both Wolsey and Henry VIII of England.

Life
He was Dean of Windsor from 1519 to 1523, then Bishop of Bath and Wells until his death. When the question of King Henry VIII's annulment of his marriage to his first wife, Catherine of Aragon, was raised Clerk was appointed as one of the Queen's counsellors. Wolsey persuaded him to agree on her behalf that she should withdraw from the proceedings at Rome. Afterwards he joined in pronouncing the annulment, and is believed to have assisted Thomas Cranmer in work on the Act of Supremacy.

His last embassy was in 1540, to the Duke of Cleves, to explain Henry's annulment of his marriage to Anne of Cleves. On his return he was taken ill at Dunkirk, possibly having been poisoned, but he managed to reach England, though only to die a short time later. He lies buried at St. Botolph's, Aldgate, not at Dunkirk, as sometimes stated.

References

External links

15th-century births
1541 deaths
Alumni of the University of Cambridge
Bishops of Bath and Wells
Deans of Windsor
Masters of the Rolls
People from Cambridge
16th-century English Roman Catholic bishops